A security domain is the determining factor in the classification of an enclave of servers/computers. A network with a different security domain is kept separate from other networks. For example, NIPRNet, SIPRNet, JWICS, and NSANet are all kept separate.

A security domain is considered to be an application or collection of applications that all trust a common security token for authentication, authorization or session management. Generally speaking, a security token is issued to a user after the user has actively authenticated with a user ID and password to the security domain.

Examples of a security domain include:
 All the web applications that trust a session cookie issued by a Web Access Management product
 All the Windows applications and services that trust a Kerberos ticket issued by Active Directory

In an identity federation that spans two different organizations that share a business partner, customer or business process outsourcing relation – a partner domain would be another security domain with which users and applications (from the local security domain) interact.

Computer networking